is an international airport located  west of the railway station in the city of Ōmura and  north northeast of the Nagasaki railway station in the city of Nagasaki, Nagasaki Prefecture, Japan.

The airport terminal and runway 14/32 are on an island, and the shorter runway 18/36 (now used by the Japan Maritime Self-Defense Force for helicopter flights) is on the mainland.

Oriental Air Bridge, a regional airline is based at the airport.

History

The mainland portion of the airport opened as a military aerodrome in 1923, and commenced civilian joint use as Omura Airport (大村空港) in 1955.

The current island runway and terminal opened on May 1, 1975, and became Japan's first full-scale airport built over water. It was also the first airport in the world to be built on the ocean. Although Nagasaki is superficially similar to Japan's other island airports, Kansai International Airport, Kobe Airport, Kitakyushu Airport, and Chūbu Centrair International Airport, Nagasaki Airport was constructed on Mishima Island. The island had 66 residents in 13 households, all of whom agreed to relocate so that the new airport could be built.

Nagasaki's first international service, to Shanghai, commenced in September 1979. There are no longer any scheduled international flights to or from Nagasaki as of December 2022. The main runway was extended from 2,500 m to its current length in 1980, and the old mainland "A runway" (18/36) was abolished in 2010.

Airlines and destinations

Statistics

Ground transportation
Several companies provide scheduled bus service to the airport from Nagasaki, Shimabara, Sasebo, and other surrounding cities. Ferry operators provide service to Togitsu, Nagayo, and the Huis ten Bosch theme park.

Gallery

References

External links

 Nagasaki Airport
 Nagasaki Airport Guide from Japan Airlines
 
 

Airports in Kyushu
Transport in Nagasaki Prefecture
Buildings and structures in Nagasaki Prefecture
Artificial island airports
Airports established in 1923
1923 establishments in Japan